Harmony Heaven is a 1930 British musical film directed by Thomas Bentley and starring Polly Ward, Stuart Hall and Trilby Clark. This film had Pathechrome inserts, and was one of Britain's first two musical films, along with Raise the Roof.

It was made at Elstree Studios with sets designed by the art director John Mead.

Cast
 Polly Ward as Billie Breeze 
 Stuart Hall as Bob Farrell 
 Trilby Clark as Lady Violet Mistley 
 Jack Raine as Stuart 
 Philip Hewland as Beasley Cutting 
 Percy Standing as Producer 
 Gus Sharland as Stage Manager 
 Aubrey Fitzgerald as Suggs 
 Edna Prince as The Singer

See also
List of early color feature films

Bibliography
 Barrios, Richard. A Song in the Dark: The Birth of the Musical Film. Oxford University Press, 2010.

References

External links
 

1930 films
1930s color films
1930s English-language films
1930 musical films
British musical films
Films shot at British International Pictures Studios
Films directed by Thomas Bentley
British black-and-white films
1930s British films